Twin Sisters is a 2013 documentary film directed by Mona Friis Bertheussen and produced by Moment Film. The film won the Audience Award at the 2013 International Documentary Film Festival Amsterdam. Twin Sisters went on to win ten other awards and has been broadcast by more than thirty television channels reaching millions of people worldwide.

Synopsis
In 2003, two baby girls were found in a cardboard box in a southern Chinese village. They were taken to an orphanage in Changsha, Hunan Province, China  and were individually adopted by two families. One of them (Alexandra Hauglum) went to live in the small village of Freskvik, Norway, surrounded by high mountains and deep fjords. The other sister (Mia Hansen) went to Sacramento, California, a much bigger city in northern California. The adoptive parents had no idea their new daughter had a twin, but through a series of inexplicable incidents, the girls were drawn back together.

The film tells the story of the twin sisters up to the time when they were reunited for the second time in person. This happened when they were 8 years old, at Alexandra's home in Norway.

Production and filming
The film took approximately four years to make. The director Mona Friis Bertheussen and cinematographer Hallgrim Haug travelled back and forth between Fresvik and Sacramento to document the contrasts and similarities between the girls’ lives. The visits led up to the girls’ first reunion in Norway, which became the highlight of the documentary.

The film received its major funding from the Norwegian Film Institute, Creative Europe, the Norwegian television channel TV2, and Swedish television channel SVT. The film also received funding from Fond for Lyd og Bilde, Fritt Ord, Arts Council Norway and Vest Norsk Filmsenter. It was pitched at the 2010 Sheffield Doc/Fest MeetMarket.

Reception
In 2014, Norway's TV2 reported that the film was its most watched documentary in more than four years. The New York Times reporting that "Everything about the Norwegian film 'Twin Sisters' seems too good to be true". Mia and Alexandra were invited to be interviewed on the popular Scandinavian talk show, Skavlan.

In the United States, acclaim for the film came through the PBS series Independent Lens which began airing Twin Sisters in October 2014.

Awards 
 2013 Audience Award, International Documentary Film Festival Amsterdam
 2014 Best Documentary Film, Monte Carlo International Television Festival
 2014 Best Director Award, National TV Awards, Gullruten
 2014 Best Feature, Olympia Film Festival ( Olympia Film Society )

References

External links

Twin Sisters at Facebook

2013 films
2013 documentary films
Norwegian documentary films
Films about twin sisters